François Ortalo-Magné is a UK-based European academic. He became the dean of the London Business School in August 2017, succeeding Andrew Likierman.

Early life
François Ortalo-Magné graduated from the École d'ingénieurs de Purpan, where he earned a master's degree in 1990. He went on to earn a PhD in Economics from the University of Minnesota in 1995.

Career
Ortalo-Magné was a professor of economics at the London School of Economics until 2001. He was the Robert E. Wangard Professor of Real Estate and the chair of the Department of Real Estate and Urban Economics at the Wisconsin School of Business from 2001 to 2011, when he became its Albert O. Nicholas dean. Ortalo-Magné became dean of the London Business School in August 2017. Ortalo-Magné is an expert in urban economics. He has published research in academic journals like The Review of Economic Studies, the Journal of Urban Economics, the Review of Economic Dynamics, the International Economic Review, and The American Economic Review

References

Living people
University of Minnesota College of Liberal Arts alumni
Academics of the London School of Economics
University of Wisconsin–Madison faculty
Academics of London Business School
20th-century French  economists
21st-century French economists
Business school deans
Year of birth missing (living people)